William Thomas Strydom (21 March 1942 – 20 February 1995) was a South African first-class cricketer who played with Orange Free State in the Currie Cup from 1961 to 1981.

A right-arm medium pace bowler, Strydom was one of four brothers to play for Orange Free State. He had his best season in 1976-77 when he took 29 wickets at 22.75. This led to his selection as one of the winners of the South African Cricket Annual Cricketer of the Year award in 1977. His best first-class figures were 5 for 52 against Griqualand West in 1978–79.

Strydom was shot and killed in 1995 during a robbery at his business premises at Pietermaritzburg.

See also
List of cricketers who were murdered

References

External links
Wisden obituary
Cricket Archive profile

1942 births
1995 deaths
Afrikaner people
South African people of Dutch descent
South African murder victims
South African cricketers
Free State cricketers
Male murder victims
People murdered in South Africa
Deaths by firearm in South Africa